Joseph Aoun may refer to:

Joseph Aoun (sport shooter) (born 1933), Lebanese 1964 Olympian
Joseph E. Aoun (born 1953), Lebanese-American theoretical syntactician and academic executive
Joseph Aoun (general) (born 1964), Lebanese military commander-in-chief